The Women's FA Community Shield is an association football match in England. It is a national super cup, and the equivalent of the FA Community Shield in male football. It is the first competitive match of the football season. The match is competed between the champions of the FA Women's Super League and the winners of the Women's FA Cup. If the Super League champions also win the FA Cup, the Cup runners-up play the match.

The first community shield match was played in 2000 and lasted until 2008. The competition was then revived in 2020.

Inauguration 
The Football Association (The FA) held the first charity match in 2000 when Double winners Charlton drew against Arsenal at Craven Cottage and shared the trophy. All proceeds were donated to Breakthrough Breast Cancer charity. The Charity Shield (Community Shield since 2002) has been sponsored by Nationwide since its inauguration.

The competition lasted until 2008 and was not contested for eleven years until the competition was revived by the FA in 2020. The match was billed as a double header after being scheduled at Wembley Stadium on the same day as the men's competition for the first time in history.

List of finals
The competition was introduced in 2000 and was held annually at different venues until it was discontinued in 2009. It returned in 2020 when it became a double-header with the men's equivalent, hosted on the same day at Wembley Stadium.

Performance by club

See also
 FA Women's Super League
 FA Women's League Cup
 Women's FA Cup

References

External links
 

England
Community Shield
Recurring sporting events established in 2000
2000 establishments in England
Recurring sporting events disestablished in 2008
2008 disestablishments in England